Psalm 140 is the 140th psalm of the biblical Book of Psalms. It is part of the final Davidic collection of psalms, comprising Psalms 138 to 145, which are specifically attributed to David in their opening verses. It describes putting one's trust in God while threatened with evil. The New King James Version entitles it a "Prayer for Deliverance from Evil Men".

In the slightly different numbering system used in the Greek Septuagint version of the Bible, and in the Latin Vulgate, this psalm is Psalm 139.

Text

Hebrew Bible version 
Following is the Hebrew text of Psalm 140:

King James Version 
 Deliver me, O LORD, from the evil man: preserve me from the violent man;
 Which imagine mischiefs in their heart; continually are they gathered together for war.
 They have sharpened their tongues like a serpent; adders' poison is under their lips. Selah.
 Keep me, O LORD, from the hands of the wicked; preserve me from the violent man; who have purposed to overthrow my goings.
 The proud have hid a snare for me, and cords; they have spread a net by the wayside; they have set gins for me. Selah.
 I said unto the LORD, Thou art my God: hear the voice of my supplications, O LORD.
 O GOD the Lord, the strength of my salvation, thou hast covered my head in the day of battle.
 Grant not, O LORD, the desires of the wicked: further not his wicked device; lest they exalt themselves. Selah.
 As for the head of those that compass me about, let the mischief of their own lips cover them.
 Let burning coals fall upon them: let them be cast into the fire; into deep pits, that they rise not up again.
 Let not an evil speaker be established in the earth: evil shall hunt the violent man to overthrow him.
 I know that the LORD will maintain the cause of the afflicted, and the right of the poor.
 Surely the righteous shall give thanks unto thy name: the upright shall dwell in thy presence. 

In the Hebrew Bibles, Psalm 140 has 14 verses, because the header of the psalm, "For the Leader. A Psalm of David" is numbered as verse 1, whereas in many English Bibles this psalm has 13 verses, because the header (To the Chief Musician. A Psalm of David in the NKJV) is not generally given a verse number.

Structure
The Hebrew word Selah, possibly an instruction on the reading of the text, breaks the psalm after verses 3, 5 and 8. C. S. Rodd argues that the psalm's structure is unclear, but suggests:
Verses 1-5: a prayer for help
Verses 6-7: an expression of confidence in God
Verses 8-11: an appeal against the psalmist's enemies
Verses 12-13: another expression of confidence in God, which may reflect a priestly or prophetic assurance that the psalmist's prayer has been heard.

Uses

New Testament
Verse 3b, The poison of asps is under their lips, is quoted in Romans .

Notes

References

External links 

 in Hebrew and English - Mechon-mamre
 King James Bible - Wikisource

140
Works attributed to David